Karaudia is a village in Ujjain district of Madhya Pradesh, India. According to Census 2011 information the location code or village code of Kadodiya village is 471683.

Demographics 
Kadodiya has a total population of 5,302 people. There are about 1,143 houses in Karaudia village. As of 2009, the village is also a gram panchayat and is located in Tarana Tehsil.

History
Karaudia or Karodia was Princely State of the British Raj before 1947. The state was ruled by the Chauhan dynasty of Rajputs.

Title of the Ruler
The ruler of the state was referred to as Raja Sahab.
The present titular head of the royal family is Raja Vijendra Singh Ji.

References
 https://archive.org/stream/imperialgazettee15grea#page/24/mode/2up
 http://members.iinet.net.au/~royalty/ips/k/k.html
 https://villageinfo.in/madhya-pradesh/ujjain/tarana/kadodiya.html

Ujjain district